CIML-FM is a First Nations community radio station that operates at 99.5 FM in Makkovik, Newfoundland and Labrador, Canada.

This station no longer appears in Industry Canada databases but appears to be operating as recently as March 2020.

References

External links

Iml